The 1951 Toledo Rockets football team was an American football team that represented Toledo University during the 1951 college football season. In their first season under head coaches Don Greenwood (games 1–7) and Clair Dunn (games 8–10), the Rockets compiled a 6–4 record and outscored their opponents by a combined total of 260 to 178.

The team's statistical leaders (through nine games) included Steve Piskach with 493 passing yards and A. C. Jenkins with 899 rushing yards.

Schedule

References

Toledo
Toledo Rockets football seasons
Toledo Rockets football